Samo Vidovič (born 24 September 1968) is a retired Slovenian footballer who played as a forward. He made one appearance for the unofficial Slovenian national team in June 1991 against Croatia, prior Slovenia gained admission to FIFA.

References

External links
 Samo Vidovič at NZS 

1968 births
Living people
People from the Municipality of Črna na Koroškem
Slovenian footballers
Slovenian expatriate footballers
Association football forwards
NK Ljubljana players
NK Korotan Prevalje players
NK Rudar Velenje players
NK Domžale players
NK Dravograd players
NK Celje players
SAK Klagenfurt players
Slovenian PrvaLiga players
Slovenian expatriate sportspeople in Austria
Expatriate footballers in Austria